Bor Pavlovčič (born 27 June 1998) is a Slovenian ski jumper.

Career
Pavlovčič made his World Cup debut in January 2016 in Sapporo. His best World Cup result is second place in Klingenthal on 7 February 2021. He also represented Slovenia at the 2016 Winter Youth Olympics, where he won gold in the boy's normal hill competition.

World Cup

Standings

Individual starts

References

 

1998 births
Living people
Sportspeople from Jesenice, Jesenice
Slovenian male ski jumpers
Ski jumpers at the 2016 Winter Youth Olympics
Youth Olympic gold medalists for Slovenia
21st-century Slovenian people